Joseph C. Vignola, Sr. (born August 11, 1949) is a Democratic politician from Philadelphia, Pennsylvania.

Political career

City Controller
In November 1982, Philadelphia City Controller Thomas Leonard resigned his post and announced his intention to run for Mayor (he would ultimately lose the Democratic nomination to Wilson Goode). Vignola ran to succeed him, and was elected in November 1983.

Senate candidacy

Vignola resigned the office of City Controller in December 1987, and subsequently announced his intention to challenge incumbent Republican Senator John Heinz in the 1988 election. Heinz, who was seeking his third term in the Senate, had amassed considerable political clout, having most recently served as Chairman of the National Republican Senatorial Committee. Vignola's candidacy struggled to gain traction, and he was ultimately defeated by over 30 percentage points, or roughly 1.5 million votes, while only carrying one county across the state–Philadelphia.

City Council tenure and return to private life
In 1991, Vignola announced his intention to challenge incumbent Democratic Councilman James Tayoun for his First District on the Philadelphia City Council. Tayoun eventually announced his intention to retire rather than seek re-election amid a federal investigation into alleged tax fraud. His candidacy was supported by his cousin, Democratic power broker and former State Senator Buddy Cianfrani, and Vignola eventually scored a narrow victory former Republican State Representative Connie McHugh in the fall general election. 

Vignola resigned his council seat in 1995, after Mayor Ed Rendell appointed him executive director of the Pennsylvania Intergovernmental Cooperation Authority (PICA).

He served in a variety of appointed positions during Rendell's gubernatorial tenure, and has subsequently returned to private business.

Personal life
In 2010, Vignola's 21-year-old son, Joseph Jr., admitted to beating an 18-year-old woman he met on the website Craigslist, and slashing her throat in a Philadelphia hotel room. He was originally sentenced to two-to-four years in prison, but later had his sentence extended to nine to 26 years when he was discovered to have lied to the court about alleged incidents of hazing during his time at the Valley Forge Military Academy.

References

External links
Profile at the Colmen Group

1949 births
Living people
Philadelphia City Council members
Pennsylvania Democrats